African vlei rats (Otomys), also known as groove-toothed rats,  live in many areas of sub-Saharan Africa.  Most species live in marshlands, grasslands, and similar habitats and feed on the vegetation of such areas, occasionally supplementing it with roots and seeds. The name "vlei" refers to the South African term for intermittent, seasonal, or perennial bodies of standing water.

Otomys are compact rodents with a tendency to shorter faces and legs than other types of rats. The tails also are shorter than most Muridae, typically between one third and two thirds of the body length.  The coat colour varies according to species, but generally they have the brown-to-grey agouti coats typical of mice and other small wild rodents. Species living in warm or temperate regions tend to have unusually large ears for murids (e.g. Otomys irroratus), whereas some of the alpine species, such as Otomys sloggetti have markedly smaller ears. (However, the latter species may no longer belong in the genus Otomys.)

Depending on the species adult Otomys have a body length between 12 and 22 cm (5–9 inches) and weigh 90 to 260 grams (3–9 oz).

Species
Genus Otomys - groove-toothed or vlei rats
Angolan vlei rat, Otomys anchietae
Angoni vlei rat, Otomys angoniensis
Barbour's vlei rat, Otomys barbouri
Burton's vlei rat, Otomys burtoni
Cheesman's vlei rat, Otomys cheesmani
Cuanza vlei rat, Otomys cuanzensis
Ruwenzori vlei rat, Otomys dartmouthi
Dent's vlei rat, Otomys denti
Dollman's vlei rat, Otomys dollmani
Charada vlei rat, Otomys fortior
Heller's vlei rat, Otomys helleri
Southern African vlei rat, Otomys irroratus
Mount Elgon vlei rat, Otomys jacksoni
Tanzanian vlei rat, Otomys lacustris
Laminate vlei rat, Otomys laminatus
Large vlei rat, Otomys maximus
Western vlei rat, Otomys occidentalis
Afroalpine vlei rat, Otomys orestes
Saunder's vlei rat, Otomys saundersiae
Simien vlei rat, Otomys simiensis
Thomas's vlei rat, Otomys thomasi
Tropical vlei rat, Otomys tropicalis
Ethiopian vlei rat, Otomys typus
Uzungwe vlei rat, Otomys uzungwensis
Yalden's vlei rat, Otomys yaldeni
Mount Kilimanjaro vlei rat, Otomys zinki

References

 
Rodent genera
Taxa named by Frédéric Cuvier